Sabri Cyrille Boumelaha (born 21 September 1989) is an footballer who plays as a left-back. Born in France, he opted to represent Algeria at international level.

Career
Boumelaha was born in Mulhouse, France. He joined FC Basel's U21 team from BSC Old Boys in July 2007 and made 28 appearances in his first season with the club. In the 2008–2009 season, Boumelaha made another 15 appearances for the reserve side before being loaned out to Challenge League side FC Concordia Basel in January for the rest of the season. On 8 March 2009, he made his professional debut for Concordia starting in a 3–1 loss against FC Locarno. He made 8 more appearances for the club before returning to FC Basel at the end of his loan.

International career
Despite being born in France, Boumelaha chose to represent Algeria in international competition. He received his first call-up to the Algerian Under-23 National Team for a training camp in September 2009. The camp was capped off with a friendly against local side CR Belouizdad, a game in which Boumelaha started in. On 14 September 2009, he received his second call up to the team.

Personal life
Boumelaha has two older brothers who are also professional footballers: Virgile Boumelaha and Olivier Boumelaha.

References

External links
 Profile at footballdatabase.eu
 Sabri Boumelaha at Swiss Football League

1989 births
Living people
Kabyle people
Footballers from Mulhouse
Association football fullbacks
Algerian footballers
French footballers
BSC Old Boys players
FC Basel players
FC Concordia Basel players
FC Thun players
FC Wil players
PFC Minyor Pernik players
FC Mulhouse players
SR Delémont players
FC Saint-Louis Neuweg players
First Professional Football League (Bulgaria) players
Expatriate footballers in Switzerland
French expatriate sportspeople in Switzerland
Algerian expatriate sportspeople in Switzerland
Expatriate footballers in Bulgaria
French people of Kabyle descent
Algerian people of French descent
Algerian expatriate sportspeople in Bulgaria
French expatriate sportspeople in Bulgaria